This is a list of Chinese football transfers for the 2012 season summer transfer window. Only moves from Super League and League One are listed. The transfer window opened from 18 June 2012 to 12 July 2012.

Super League

Beijing Guoan

In:

Out:

Changchun Yatai

In:

Out:

Dalian Aerbin

In:

Out:

Dalian Shide

In:

Out:

Guangzhou Evergrande

In:

Out:

Guangzhou R&F

In:

Out:

Guizhou Renhe

In:

Out:

Hangzhou Greentown

In:

Out:

Henan Jianye

In:

Out:

Jiangsu Sainty

In:

Out:

Liaoning Whowin

In:

Out:

Qingdao Jonoon

In:

Out:

Shandong Luneng

In:

Out:

Shanghai Shenhua

In:

Out:

Shanghai Shenxin

In:

Out:

Tianjin Teda

In:

Out:

League One

Beijing Baxy

In:

Out:

Beijing Technology

In:

Out:

Chengdu Blades

In:

Out:

Chongqing F.C.

In:

Out:

Chongqing Lifan

In:

Out:

Fujian Smart Hero

In:

Out:

Guangdong Sunray Cave

In:

Out:

Harbin Yiteng

In:

Out:

Hohhot Dongjin

In:

Out:

Hunan Billows

In:

Out:

Shanghai Tellace

In:

Out:

Shenyang Shenbei

In:

Out:

Shenzhen Ruby

In:

Out:

Tianjin Songjiang

In:

Out:

Wuhan Zall

In:

Out:

Yanbian Changbai Tiger

In:

Out:

References

2012
2012 in Chinese football
Chinese